Kevi Rite Jaish is a 2012 Indian Gujarati-language drama film directed by Abhishek Jain and produced by Nayan Jain. The film is a satire on the fascination and obsession of the Patels' – a Gujarati farmer community – migration to the U.S. Over the last half century, thousands of Patels have migrated to the US and have come to dominate its motel industry. The film stars Divyang Thakkar, Veronica Kalpana-Gautam, Tejal Panchasara, Kenneth Desai, and Anang Desai. The success of the film started a "new wave" in the Gujarati cinema.

Plot

In a flashback, Bachu (Kenneth Desai) and Ishwar (Anang Desai) are close friends who dream of going to the USA together, illegally, though Bachu doesn't have enough money yet. One day, Bachu receives a telephone call from Ishwar saying he has managed to reach the US. Bachu feels betrayed and starts resenting his friend.

In present, Bachu has two sons, Jignesh and Harish (Divyang Thakkar). Jignesh is married and expecting a child. The younger son, Harish, just like his father, dreams to go to the US, one way or another. Bachu wants to realize his own dream through his son. Harish applies for a visa, but is ultimately rejected due to his inability to give satisfactory answers to the visa officer, Derek Thomas (Tom Alter). Meanwhile, Ishwar returns to India with his daughter, Aayushi (Veronica Kalpana-Gautam). Ishwar is now very successful in the United States; he has a chain of motels and is now known as Motel King. His purpose is to invest in Gujarat and ultimately return to his motherland and settle there. Bachu still resents his old friend, but Harish falls in love with Aayushi, in spite of his father warning against it. Harish's friend, Raheel, introduces him to his acquaintance, Kaivan (who has changed his name to Kevin), who is soon going to the US, and introduces him to his travel agent, Daulatram Chainani (Rakesh Bedi). Chainani assures Harish and his father that he'll groom Harish and make sure he gets the visa, but will need money, to which his brother, Jignesh promises that he'll arrange for the money. Jignesh borrows money from anti-social elements, who are now threatening him unless he returns the money soon. In a party arranged by Kevin, one of his friends warns Aayushi about Kevin, saying that he is not a reliable man and is going to the US by using someone else's sponsorship papers. When drunk, Aayushi warns Harish about Kevin, but Harish dismisses her concerns. One day, Harish finds out about the illegal racket Chainani is running for illegal entry to the US. Chainani also reveals that Kevin used Harish's sponsorship papers to reach the US. When all hope is lost, one of Bachu's acquaintances informs him that he has managed a fake passport using which Harish can travel to the US; Bachu and Harish agree to that. Jignesh confronts his father for always shooting him down as dafol (stupid) and threatens to sever ties with the family and the same time there are complications in Jignesh's wife pregnancy and is admitted to the hospital.

When Harish is travelling to the airport with his friends to leave for the US on the fake passport, they are assaulted by people from whom Jignesh had borrowed money. Harish manages to escape and reaches the airport and is bade farewell by his parents. When Bachu returns to his house, Ishwar confronts him and tell him about his life and struggles as an illegal immigrant and hardships he had to endure before being motel king. Bachu realizes his mistake and they rush to the airport to stop Harish, only to find that Harish, touched by the plight of an old lady (Rita Bhaduri), deliberately did not board the flight as he decided to stay with parents, friends, and Aayushi. Bachu apologizes to his son Jignesh and the family is reunited

In epilogue, it's revealed that Harish and Aayushi are married and they're looking for their options for a honeymoon; Harish is still insistent on going to the US for it.

Cast
 Divyang Thakkar as Harish Patel
 Veronica Kalpana-Gautam as Aayushi Patel
 Tom Alter as Uncle Sam / Derek Thomas
 Rakesh Bedi as Daulatram Chainani
 Rita Bhaduri as Old Lady
 Anang Desai as Ishwarbhai Patel
 Abhinay Banker as Raheel
 Siddharth Amit Bhavsar as Kevin
 Aakash Maheriya as Mehul
 Abhishek Jain as Kevin's friend
 Tejal Panchasara as Bhavna Jignesh Patel
 Kenneth Desai as Bachubhai Patel
 Raju Barot as Old Man
 Jay Upadhyay as Jignesh Patel
 Dipti Joshi as Jyotsnaben Bachubhai Patel
 Hemin Trivedi as match maker
 Malhar Thakar as Guy at VISA office

Production

Development
The director, Abhishek Jain, is an alumnus of Whistling Woods. After finishing the course, he assisted Sanjay Leela Bhansali and Subhash Ghai on Saawariya and Yuvvraaj respectively. Then he moved to Ahmedabad and made a Gujarati film. Abhishek Jain approached Anurag Kashyap to produce the film; although Kashyap was impressed with the script, the collaboration did not work out for the film. Divyang Thakkar, the protagonist of the film, has mentioned it as "natural progression to do a local film, rather than try" his "luck in a Bollywood film immediately." Veronica Kalpana Gautam (from Surat) was discovered as the lead female via Facebook and considered the film "path breaking". Anang Desai, although being a Gujarati, had never acted in a Gujarati movie until Kevi Rite Jaish as he said he "was waiting for a project that I can connect with".

Filming
The director of photography, Pushkar Singh, visited Ahmedabad a year before the principal shooting to understand the lighting conditions of the city and made a video as part of the pre-production. The film was filmed with a RED Camera in Ahmedabad, Gujarat. This is the first time a RED Camera has been used in India for regional films. The film is shot mostly in Ahmedabad at 34 locations. The shooting of the film was completed in 23 days.

One of the scenes in the party sequence required more than 500 empty liquor bottles and Gujarat, where the principal shooting took place, has alcohol prohibition, so the art director Taj Naqvi and his team started scouting for it 8 days prior to the schedule. 'ravi vaari bajaar' to posh hotels, residence to open grounds they collected these bottles and on the day of the shoot managed to get 731 empty liquor bottles. To avoid any police suspicion, the bottles were transported during the night and the art director Taj Naqvi ended up doing a cameo as a bartender in the movie. The casting director, Abhinay Banker, ended up auditioning for the protagonist's friend, Raheel, and was selected to play the role. The female protagonist, Veronica Kalpana-Gautam, is introduced in the film in slow motion as a tribute to Martin Scorsese; he often introduces his blonde heroines in idealizing slow-motion shots, as a possible tribute to Alfred Hitchcock.

Soundtrack

Kevi Rite Jaish features songs sung by Roop Kumar Rathod, Suraj Jagan, Vishvesh Parmar, Parthiv Gohil, Mehul Surti, Aishwarya Majmudar and Aman Lekhadia for the film. The sound track was launched on 26 May 2012 at Ahmedabad. The album was made available for free to download on the official website. The response to the music has been very positive, with the soundtrack being described as soulful and praised for lyrics, especially Pankhida, the rock version of a popular garba song of the same name, which was a viral hit.

Release
The official poster for the film was released on 28 April 2012. The first trailer was released online on 2 May 2012 and was received positively by the audiences. The film was released on 15 June in India. The film was initially released in major Gujarat cities, Vadodara, Ahmedabad, Surat as well as some small cities, and also in Mumbai. In the first week, the film was released with 34 prints and increased to 60 prints in the second week due to increasing demand. After the initial success in Gujarat, the film was planned to be released in USA, UK, Australia, New Zealand and some middle-eastern countries as well, subsequently it was released in USA (at New Jersey and Chicago) on 31 August 2012.

Marketing
The premier was held at Cinépolis, Ahmedabad and was attended by the whole cast and crew. As part of promoting the movie, special screenings were held along with crew at Rajkot, Vadodara, Surat and Ahmedabad. The makers have widely used social media for the promotion of the movie. They released a Facebook game as well.

Critical reception
Initial reviews of the movie were positive. Long live cinema called the movie a "glimmer of hope" for Gujarati cinema. Leading Gujarati newspapers reviewed the film positively. Divya Bhaskar rated the movie 3.5 out of 5 stars and called it a "truly urban film" and "revolutionary". Gujarat Samachar also reviewed it positively.  DNA praised the movie saying "KRJ in all is a funny roller coaster ride with its own share of romance, drama, apprehension, desperation, exhilaration and insanity". Leading Gujarati blog Desh Gujarat also praised the movie calling it "paisa vasool". Leading Gujarat Samachar columnist, Jay Vasavada, called it the best Gujarati film since Bhavni Bhavai.

Boxoffice
The film ran more than for six weeks in Bharuch, and ten weeks in Ahmedabad, Vadodara and a few other cities. The film eventually completed sixteen weeks.

Awards

2012 BIG Gujarati Entertainment Awards

The film was nominated for all eight categories and won in seven of them

Film
 Best actor (male) – Divyang Thakkar
 Best actor (female) – Veronica Gautam
 Best director – Abhishek Jain
 Best film

Music
 Best male playback singer – Roop Kumar Rathod (Kevi rite jaish)
 Best female playback singer – Aishwarya Majumdar (Bheeni bheeni)
 Best music album
 Best entertaining song – Pankhida Vishvesh Parmar

12th Annual Transmedia Gujarati Screen & Stage awards

The film was nominated for 15 categories and won 10 awards.

Film
 Best film
 Best director
 Best story – Abhishek Jain, Anish Shah
 Best debutant (female) – Veronica Gautam
 Best supporting actor (male) – Anang Desai
 Best cinematography – Pushkar Singh

Music
 Best music – Mehul Surti
 Best male playback singer – Parthiv Gohil
 Best female playback singer – Aishwarya Majumdar
 Best lyrics – Raeesh Maniar

References

External links
 Official website at 
 

2012 films
Indian comedy films
Films shot in India
Films set in Ahmedabad
Films shot in Ahmedabad
Films shot in Gujarat
2012 directorial debut films
2010s Gujarati-language films
2012 comedy films